A curette is a surgical instrument designed for scraping or debriding biological tissue or debris in a biopsy, excision, or cleaning procedure. In form, the curette is a small hand tool, often similar in shape to a stylus; at the tip of the curette is a small scoop, hook, or gouge. The verb to curette means "to scrape with a curette", and curettage ( or ) is treatment that involves such scraping.

Uses 
Some examples of medical use of a curette include:

 the removal of impacted ear wax;
 dilation and curettage of the uterus, a gynecologic procedure;
excision of many benign tumors and some malignant tumors;
 excision of the adenoids (adenoidectomy) by an otolaryngologist;
 to scrape tartar deposits from tooth enamel with a periodontal curette.

See also
Ear pick

References

External links

Curette images from the Waring Historical Library at the Medical University of South Carolina

Surgical instruments